Gunilla Tjernberg (1950 – 22 July 2019) was a Swedish Christian Democratic politician. She had been a member of the Riksdag since 1998.

References

External links
Gunilla Tjernberg at the Riksdag website

Members of the Riksdag from the Christian Democrats (Sweden)
2019 deaths
1950 births
Women members of the Riksdag
Members of the Riksdag 2002–2006
21st-century Swedish women politicians
Members of the Riksdag 1998–2002
Members of the Riksdag 2006–2010